In the run-up to the next Australian federal election, it is expected a number of polling companies will conduct regular opinion polls for various news organisations. These polls will collect data on parties' primary vote, and likely contain an estimation of the two-party-preferred vote.

Graphical summary

Primary vote

Two-party preferred

Voting intention

2023

2022

Preferred prime minister and leadership polling

Graphical summary
The following graphical summaries illustrate results from opinion polling for preferred Prime Minister and their respective approval ratings based on data below that is documented in the tables.

Preferred Prime Minister

Leadership approval ratings

Preferred Prime Minister and leadership polling table

2023

2022

Sub-national polling

New South Wales

Graphical summary

Victoria

Graphical summary

Polling

Queensland

Graphical summary

Polling

Western Australia

Graphical summary

Polling

South Australia

Graphical summary

Polling

Tasmania

Graphical summary

Polling

See also 
Opinion polling for the 2022 Australian federal election

References

Australia
2025
Federal elections in Australia